Florin Sandu  (born 3 September 1987 in Iași) is a Romanian former footballer. He usually played on the left wing, either as defender, or as midfielder.

Politehnica Timișoara 
Together with teammate Sebastian Cojocnean, he was transferred to Timișoara in late September 2007, for a fee of EUR 550.000. He was loaned out to Sportul Studențesc in the second part of the 2007–2008 season, and in 2008–2009 he was part of the group of Timișoara players who moved to Buftea. He made the debut at FC Timișoara against Sanatatea Cluj in Cupa României score 7–0.

External links
 
 

Living people
1987 births
Romanian footballers
CS Otopeni players
FC Sportul Studențesc București players
FC Politehnica Timișoara players
LPS HD Clinceni players
FC Gloria Buzău players
SCM Râmnicu Vâlcea players
CS Concordia Chiajna players
CS Gaz Metan Mediaș players
Liga I players
Association football wingers
Association football fullbacks
People from Ilfov County